John Sessions Stadium is a baseball venue located on the campus of Jacksonville University in Jacksonville, Florida, United States.  It is home to the Jacksonville Dolphins baseball team, a member of the Division I Atlantic Sun Conference.  The stadium has a capacity of 1,500 people.  It is named after the late John F. Sessions, a benefactor of the university.

In 2008, a new scoreboard, entrance, and backstop were added to the field.

See also
 List of NCAA Division I baseball venues

References

Baseball venues in Florida
College baseball venues in the United States
Jacksonville Dolphins baseball